A yashmak, yashmac or yasmak (from Turkish yaşmak, "a veil") is a Turkish and Turkmen type of veil or niqāb worn by women to cover their faces in public. Today there is almost no usage of this garment in Turkey. In Turkmenistan, however, it is still consciously used by some married women in the presence of elder relatives of a husband.

Description
Unlike an ordinary veil, a yashmak contains a head-veil and a face-veil in one, thus consisting of two pieces of fine muslin, one tied across the face under the nose, and the other tied across the forehead draping the head.

A yashmak can also include a rectangle of woven black horsehair attached close to the temples and sloping down like an awning to cover the face, called peçe, or it can be a veil covered with pieces of lace, having slits for the eyes, tied behind the head by strings and sometimes supported over the nose by a small piece of gold.

See also
Islam and clothing
Burqa
Chador
Hijab
Tudung

Notes

Sources

External links

 "The Costumes of Ottoman Women"

 
Islamic female clothing
Ottoman clothing
Turkish words and phrases
Veils